The Washington Tilth Association (originally the Northwest Tilth Association) is an American nonprofit membership organization dedicated to supporting and advocating organic food and farming.

Chapters
 Pierce Tilth Association
 Seattle Tilth
 South Whidbey Tilth
 Sno-Valley Tilth
 Spokane Tilth
 Tilth on the Willapa
 Tilth Producers of Washington
 Vashon Island Growers Assn. (VIGA)

See also
Oregon Tilth

References
 (review)

Further reading

External links

Guide to the Tilth Association Papers 1974-1986 (Manuscripts, Archives, and Special Collections, Washington State University Libraries)

Agriculture in Washington (state)
Agricultural organizations based in the United States
Organic farming organizations
Organic farming in the United States
Environmental organizations established in 1974
1974 establishments in Washington (state)
Non-profit organizations based in Washington (state)